Tumble Falls is an unincorporated community located within Kingwood Township in Hunterdon County, New Jersey, United States. The settlement is located along an unnamed tributary of the Delaware River where a small intermittent waterfall is found in the central part of the township within the Lockatong Formation. The location of the waterfall is at the intersection of Tumble Falls Road and New Jersey Route 29 and is part of the New Jersey Conservation Foundation purchased from private landowners in December 2002.

References

Kingwood Township, New Jersey
Unincorporated communities in Hunterdon County, New Jersey
Unincorporated communities in New Jersey